Barahona is a barrio in the municipality of Morovis, Puerto Rico. Barahona has thirteen sectors and its population in 2010 was 5,244.

History
Puerto Rico was ceded by Spain in the aftermath of the Spanish–American War under the terms of the Treaty of Paris of 1898 and became an unincorporated territory of the United States. In 1899, the United States Department of War conducted a census of Puerto Rico finding that the population of Barahona barrio was 854.

After Hurricane Maria destroyed critical infrastructure in Puerto Rico on September 20, 2017, the Puerto Rico National Guard was tasked with providing people with potable water.

Sectors

Barrios (which are roughly comparable to minor civil divisions) in turn are further subdivided into smaller local populated place areas/units called sectores (sectors in English). The types of sectores may vary, from normally sector to urbanización to reparto to barriada to residencial, among others.

The following sectors are in Barahona barrio:

, and  
.

Gallery
Scenes in Barahona, Morovis:

See also

 List of communities in Puerto Rico

References

External links
 

Barrios of Morovis, Puerto Rico